A Ralli car (or Rally cart) is a traditional type of horse-drawn cart, named after the Ralli family. The vehicle was commonly used as a general run-around for families. It has back-to-back seating with space under the seats for luggage or shopping bags.

References

External links
Outdoor Carts Review

Carriages
Carts